Ultimate Breaks and Beats (also commonly abbreviated as UBB) was a series of 25 compilation albums released from 1986 to 1991 by Street Beat Records edited by "BreakBeat Lou" Flores.  Featured on the albums were tracks from 1966 to 1984 that included drum breaks.

The albums found high popularity with hip hop producers, with the release of a new volume in the series usually leading to many various hip hop records featuring samples of the breaks.

Re-releases of the LPs, some packaged in pairs for DJ scratching and mixing convenience, became available and are currently found in many record stores. CDs of some of the volumes may be found as well, including a 2-CD and DVD box set featuring nearly all of the tracks on the 25 albums.

Releases
Complete track listing, taken from Geocities.com and updated with performers' names, missing in the track lists of volumes SBR 499, SBR 500 and the first version of SBR 508.

An asterisk after a track name indicates that the song was remixed for inclusion in this compilation.

Not official

SBR 499
 The Limit – "She's So Divine" (from CP-721 12" single) (1982)
 Kashif – "I Just Gotta Have You (Lover Turn Me On)" (from CP-728 12" single) (1982)
 Kenton Nix featuring Bobby Youngblood – "There's Never Been (No One Like You)" (from WES 22130 12" single) (1980)
 Mr. Magic – "Magic's Message (There Has to Be a Better Way)" (from POS-1213 12" single) (1984)

SBR 500 
 Tia Monae – "Don't Keep Me Waiting" (from CART-320 12" single) (1983)
 Cloud One – "Flying High" (from HS-1010 12" single) (1982)
 Ednah Holt – "Serious, Sirius Space Party" (from WES 22138 12" single) (1981)
  – "Let's Do It" (from S-12336 12" single) (1980)

Official start of the series

SBR 501 
 The Monkees – "Mary Mary"* (from More of the Monkees) (1967) Colgems Records
 Wilbur "Bad" Bascomb – "Black Grass"* (from PAS-6048 7" single) (1972) Paramount Records
 The Winstons – "Amen, Brother"* (from MMS-117 7" single) (1969) Metromedia Records***
 7th Wonder – "Daisy Lady" (from Climbing Higher) (1979) Parachute Records
 D.C. LaRue – "Indiscreet" (from The Tea Dance) (1976) Pyramid Records
 Rufus Thomas – "Do the Funky Penguin" (from STA-0112 7" single) (1971) Stax Records

 Note The Break on "Amen Brother" was pitch down to 33 1/3***

SBR 502 
 Wilson Pickett – "Get Me Back on Time, Engine #9"* (from Wilson Pickett in Philadelphia) (1970) Atlantic Records
 Juice – "Catch a Groove"* (from DGD-108 12" single) (1976) Greedy Records
 The Rolling Stones – "Honky Tonk Women"* (from Through the Past, Darkly (Big Hits Vol. 2)) (1969) London Records
 Funkadelic – "You'll Like it Too" (from Connections & Disconnections) (1981) LAX Records
 Roy Ayers Ubiquity – "Boogie Back" (from Change Up the Groove) (1974) Polydor Records
 Orchestra Internationale featuring Sal Conte – "Chella llà" (from Disco Italiano) (1974) Fiesta Records

SBR 503 
 Cheryl Lynn – "Got to Be Real" (from Cheryl Lynn) (1978) Columbia records
 Incredible Bongo Band – "Apache" (from Bongo Rock) (1973) Pride/MGM Records
 Herman Kelly & Life – "Dance to the Drummer's Beat" (from Percussion Explosion) (1978) TK Disco / Alston / Electric Cat Records
 Incredible Bongo Band – "Bongo Rock"* (from Bongo Rock) (1973) Pride/MGM Records
 Upp – "Give It to You" (from Upp) (1975) Epic Records
 Jackie Robinson – "Pussyfooter"* (from I'm Different) (1977) Les Disques Direction Records

SBR 504 
 Syl Johnson – "Different Strokes"* (from TM-2242 7" single) (1967) Twilight Records
 Bobby Byrd – "I Know You Got Soul"* (from I Need Help) (1970) King Records
 Z. Z. Hill – "I Think I'd Do It"* (from The Brand New Z.Z. Hill) (1971) Mankind Records
 Gaz – "Sing Sing" (from Gaz) (1979) SalSoul Records
 Isaac Hayes – "Breakthrough" (from the Truck Turner soundtrack) (1974) Enterprise Records
 Tom Jones – "Looking Out My Window"* (from "45-40035" 7" single (1968) Parrot Records ***Note: Looking Out My Window" does not appear on the 1968 LP "Help Yourself" although it does so on later cd reissues.
 Dynamic Corvettes – "Funky Music Is the Thing Part 2" (from ABET-5459 7" single) (1975) Abet Records

SBR 505 
 Johnny "Hammond" Smith – "Shifting Gears"* (from Gears) (1975) Milestone Records
 Bo Diddley – "Hit or Miss"* (from Big Bad Bo) (1974) Cadet / Chess Records
 The Wild Magnolias – "(Somebody Got) Soul, Soul, Soul"* (from The Wild Magnolias) (1974) Polydor Records
 Melvin Bliss – "Synthetic Substitution" (from SU-527 7" single) (1973) Sunburst Records
 Freedom – "Get Up and Dance" (from Farther Than Imagination) (1979) TK Disco / Malaco Records
 20th Century Steel Band – "Heaven and Hell Is on Earth" (from Warm Heart, Cold Steel) (1975) United Artists Records
 Banbarra – "Shack Up Part 2" (from UAXW-734Y 7" single) (1975)

SBR 506 
 Please – "Sing a Simple Song" (from Please) (1975) Telefunken Records
 James Brown – "Cold Sweat" (from Cold Sweat) (1967) King Records
 The Cecil Holmes Soulful Sounds – "2001" (from The Black Motion Picture Experience) (1973) Buddah records
 Dennis Coffey – "Son of Scorpio"* (from Electric Coffey) (1972) Sussex Records
 The Magic Disco Machine – "Scratchin'"* (from Disc-O-Tech) (1975) Motown records
 Fat Larry's Band – "Down on the Avenue" (from Feel It) (1976) WMot Records
 Uncle Louie – "I Like Funky Music" (from "Uncle Louie's Here" - 12" Remix - MAR-434) Marlin Records (1979)

SBR 507 
 James Brown – "Give It Up or Turnit a Loose" (from Sex Machine (album) (1970) (Note: The original version has the guitar hook, while both the remixed version and the live version have the drum breaks.) Polydor Records
 Funky Constellation – "Street Talk (Madam Rapper)" (from FUNC-369 12" single) (1979) ROTA Records
 Pleasure – "Let’s Dance" (from Accept No Substitutes) (1976) Fantasy Records
 John Davis and the Monster Orchestra – "I Can’t Stop" (from Night and Day) (1976) SAM Records
 John McLaughlin and the Mahavishnu Orchestra – "Planetary Citizen" (from Inner Worlds) (1975) CBS Records
 Funkadelic – "Good Old Music" (from Funkadelic) (1970) Westbound Records
 William Ray – "You Are What You Are" (Sammy Lee Pickens) (from DMT-1001 12" single) (1977) Magic Touch Records

Discontinued (see notes below)

SBR 508 
 The Puppets – "The Way of Life" (from the QUS-055 12" single) (1983)
 Wish & Fonda Rae – "Touch Me (All Night Long)" (from RHR 3376 12" single) (1984)
 Up Front – "Infatuation" (from SC-16 12" single) (1983)
 Stacye Branché – "Precious and Special" (from BO-03055 12" single) (1983)

Continued

SBR 509 
 Ingrid – "Easter Parade" (from POSPX-529 12" single) (1982) Polydor Records
 ESG – "UFO"* (from ESG) (1981) 99 Records
 Billy Squier – "Big Beat" (from The Tale of the Tape) (1980) Capitol Records
 Liquid Liquid – "Cavern" (from Optimo EP) (1983) 99 Records
 Mountain – "Long Red"* (from Mountain Live: The Road Goes Ever On) (1972) Windfall Records
 Tyrone Thomas and the Whole Darn Family – "Seven Minutes of Funk" (from Has Arrived) (1976) Soul International Records

 Note UFO by ESG was pitched down from 45rpm to 33 1/3rpm****

SBR 510 
 James Brown – "Funky President" (from Reality) (1974) Polydor Records
 Dexter Wansel – "Theme from the Planets"* (from Life on Mars) (1976) Philadelphia International Records
 Rhythm Heritage – "Theme from "S.W.A.T.""* (from Disco-Fied) (1978) ABC Records
 The Jackson Five – "It's Great to Be Here"* (from Maybe Tomorrow) (1971) Motown Records
 The Brothers Johnson – "Ain't We Funkin' Now" (12 inch Version ) (1978) A&M Records
 La Pregunta – "Shangri La" (from GNP-12001 12" single) (1978) GNP Records
 Esther Williams – "Last Night Changed It All (I Really Had a Ball)"*** ( Album version ) (1976) 'Friends & Co. Records

1 – The Lp, 45rpm and the 12" of "Last Night Changed It All" are all different versions from one another.

2 – Note: "Theme from the Planets" was recorded at 45 rpm speed on this release.

SBR 511 
 The Honey Drippers – "Impeach the President"* (from AL-1017 7" single) (1973) Alaga Records
 The Headhunters – "God Make Me Funky" (from Survival of the Fittest) (1975) Arista Records
 Lucy Hawkins – "Gotta Get Out of Here" (from S-12455 12" single) (1978) SAM Records
 Orange Krush – "Action"* (from MDS-4018 12" single) (1982) Prep Street / Mercury Records
 Funk Inc. – "Kool Is Back" (from Funk, Inc.) (1971) Prestige Records
 Fausto Papetti – "Love's Theme"* (from 18a Raccolta) (1975) Durium Records

SBR 512 
 Junie – "Granny's Funky Rolls Royce" (from Freeze) (1975) Westbound Records
 James Brown – "Funky Drummer"* (from King Records – 45-6290 7" single) (1969) King Records
 The Mohawks – "The Champ" (from PM-719 7" single) (1968) Pama Records
 Aerosmith – "Walk This Way" (from Toys in the Attic) (1975) Columbia Records
 Thin Lizzy – "Johnny the Fox Meets Jimmy the Weed" (from Johnny the Fox) (1978) Mercury Records
 The Soul Searchers – "Ashley's Roachclip"* (from Salt of the Earth) (1974) Sussex Records
 Chicago Gangsters – "Gangster Boogie"* (from Blind Over You) (1975) Gold Plate Records
 T-Connection – "Groove to Get Down" (from On Fire) (1977) Dash Records

SBR 513 
 Babe Ruth – "The Mexican" (from First Base) (1973) Harvest / EMI Records
 Babe Ruth – "Keep Your Distance"* (from Kid's Stuff) (1976) Capitol Records
 Coke Escovedo – "(Runaway) I Wouldn't Change a Thing" (from Comin' at Ya) (1976) 2 Mercury Records
 Eastside Connection – "Frisco Disco" (from AFT-1001 12" single) (1978) Rampart Records
 In Search Of...Orchestra – "Phenomena Theme" (from AVID-12146 12" single) (1977) AVI Records
 The Meters – "Handclapping Song" (from Struttin') (1970) Josie Records

2 – "(Runaway) I Wouldn't Change a Thing" is actually two songs by Coke Escovedo put into one track: the ending of "Runaway" and "I Wouldn't Change a Thing".

SBR 514 
 Stanley Turrentine and Milt Jackson – "Sister Sanctified" (from Cherry) (1972) CTI Records
 J. J. Johnson – "Willie Chase" (from the Willie Dynamite soundtrack) (1974) MCA Records
 Kid Dynamite – "Uphill Peace of Mind" (from Kid Dynamite) (1976) Cream Records
 Ralph MacDonald – "Jam on the Groove" (from Sound of a Drum) (1976) Marlin Records
 Experience Unlimited – "Knock Him Out Sugar Ray" (from VMT-25 12" single) (1980) Vermack Records
 Fred Wesley & The J.B.'s – "Blow Your Head" (from Damn Right I Am Somebody) (1974) People Records

SBR 515 
 Donald Byrd – "Change (Makes You Want to Hustle)" (from Places and Spaces) (1975) Blue Note Records
 Roy Ayers – "Brother Green (The Disco King)" (from Mystic Voyage) (1975) Polydor Records
 Grover Washington Jr. – "Mister Magic" (from Mister Magic) (1975) Motown Records
 David Matthews – "Star Wars" (from Dune) (1977) CTI Records
 John Cougar Mellencamp – "Jack and Diane" (from American Fool) (1982) Riva Records
 Pleasure – "Bouncy Lady" (from Dust Yourself Off) (1975) Fantasy Records
 Jefferson Starship – "Rock Music" (from Freedom at Point Zero) (1979) Grunt/RCA Records

SBR 516 
 Commodores – "The Assembly Line" (from Machine Gun) (1974) Motown Records
 Johnny Jenkins – "I Walk On Gilded Splinters" (from Ton-Ton Macoute!) (1974) Capricorn Records
 Le Pamplemousse – "Gimme What You Got"* (from Le Pamplemousse) (1976) AVI Records
 Marvin Gaye – "T Plays it Cool" (from Trouble Man – the soundtrack album for the film of the same name) (1972) Talma Records
 Lyn Collins – "Think (About It)"* (from Think (About It)) (1972) People Records
 The Galactic Force Band – "Space Dust"* (from Spaced Out Disco) (1978) Springboard Records
 Steve Miller Band – "Take the Money and Run"* (from Fly Like an Eagle) (1976) Capitol Records

SBR 517 
 Baby Huey – "Listen to Me" (from The Living Legend) (1971) Curtom Records
 Bobbie Knight & The Universal Lady – "The Lovermaniacs (Sex)"* (from Earth Creature) (1974) Brunswick Records
 The Pointer Sisters – "Yes We Can Can" (from Pointer Sisters) (1973) Blue Thumb Records
 Monk Higgins – "One Man Band (Plays All Alone)" (from Dance to the Disco Sax) (1974) Buddah Records
 Kool & The Gang – "N.T."  (from Live at PJ's) (1971) De-Lite Records
 Dyke & the Blazers – "Let a Woman Be a Woman, Let a Man Be a Man"* (from Greatest Hits) (1969) Original Sounds Records
 Bram Tchaikovsky – "Whiskey and Wine" (live version from "The Girl Of My Dreams" 7" E.P.') (1979) Radar Records***note The song "Whiskey & Wine" was originally covered by the group The Motors and Bram Tchaikovsky was an original member. Their version from the album "1" is a studio recording and has no drum break***
 "L.L. Bonus Beats" – Fancy – "Feel Good"* (from Wild Thing) (1974) Big Three Records BT 89502 ***note; Looped as a 1:40 min. bonus beat on vinyl edition at 45 RPM***.

SBR 518 
 Bar-Kays – "Let's Have Some Fun" (from Flying High on Your Love) (1977) Mercury Records
 Lafayette Afro Rock Band – "Conga" (from Malik) (1976) Makossa Records
 Yellow Sunshine – "Yellow Sunshine" (from ZS72511 7" single) (1973) TSOP Records
 The Jimmy Castor Bunch – "It's Just Begun"* (from It's Just Begun) (1972) RCA Records
 Marva Whitney – "It's My Thing" (from It's My Thing") (1969) King Records
 Kay Gees – "I Believe in Music" (from Find a Friend) (1976) Gang Records
 Dennis Coffey – "Ride Sally Ride" (from Goin' for Myself) (1972) Sussex Records

4 – ***Note that the intro used in the beginning of the song is taken from the group's track "Troglodyte (Cave Man)".

 SBR 519 
 The Blackbyrds – "Rock Creek Park" (from City Life) (1975) Fantasy Records
 KC and the Sunshine Band – "I Get Lifted" (from KC and the Sunshine Band) (1975) TK Disco Records
 Brother Soul – "Cookies" (from LS-105 7" single) (1975) Leo Mini Records
 Foster Sylvers – "Misdemeanor" (from Foster Sylvers) (1973) Pride / MGM Records
 Wild Sugar – "Bring it Here" (from the TS-2004 12" single) (1981) TSOB Records
 Miami – "Chicken Yellow" (from The Party Freaks) (1974) Drive Records
 The Olympic Runners – "Put the Music Where Your Mouth Is" (from Put the Music Where Your Mouth Is) (1974) London Records
 Lightnin' Rod – "Sport" (from Hustlers Convention) (1973) United Artists Records

 SBR 520 
 Roy Ayers – "Lonesome Cowboy"* (from Everybody Loves the Sunshine) (1976) Polydor Records
 Duke Williams – "Chinese Chicken" (from Monkey in a Silk Suit is Still a Monkey) (1973) Capricorn Records
 Joe Quarterman – "I'm Gonna Get You"* (from GSF Records 6915 7" single) (1974) GSF Records
 Friend & Lover – "Reach Out of the Darkness"* (from Reach Out of the Darkness) (1973) Verve Forecast Records
 The Chubukos – "House of Rising Funk" (from Soul Makossa) (1973) Mainstream / Red Lion Production Records
 Eddie Bo – "Hook & Sling" (from Scram Records 117 7" single) (1969) Scram Records
 Bill Withers – "Kissing My Love" (from Still Bill) (1971) Sussex Records

5 – The group was called The Chubukos for the 7" single, but they were called Afrique for their LP Soul Makossa.

 SBR 521 
 The Politicians – "Free Your Mind" (from The Politicians Featuring McKinley Jackson) (1972) Hot Wax Records
 The Village Callers – "Hector" (from Live) (1967) Rampart Records 
 Joe Tex – "Papa Was Too"* (from ATL-70199 7" single) (1966) Dial / Atlantic Records
 Sound Experience – "Devil with the Bust" (from Don't Fight the Feeling) (1974) Philly Soulville Records
 James Brown – "Soul Pride" (from The Popcorn) (1969) King Records
 All the People – "Cramp Your Style"* (from Blue Candle 1496 7" single) (1972) Blue Candle Records
 Johnny Pate – "Shaft in Africa" (from Shaft in Africa soundtrack) (1973) ABC Records
 Barry White – "I'm Gonna Love You Just a Little Bit More Baby"* (from I've Got So Much to Give) (1973) 20th Century Records
 "L.L. Bonus Beats #2" – Tommy Roe – "Dizzy" (1969) ABC Records ***Note... Looped into a 1:40 min bonus beat.

 SBR 522 
 Barrabas – "Woman" (from Barrabas) (1972) RCA Records
 Creative Source – "Corazon" (from Migration) (1974) Sussex Records
 Southside Movement – "Save the World" (from Movin') (1974) 20th Century Records
 The J.B.'s – "The Grunt (Part 1)"* (from Food for Thought) (1970) King Records
 Rufus Thomas – "Do the Funky Penguin (Part 2)"* (from STA-0112 7" single) (1971) Stax Records
 Shotgun – "Dynamite (The Bomb)"* (from Shotgun) (1977) ABC Records
 Gary Numan "Films" (from The Pleasure Principle)(1979) Beggars Banquet Records

 SBR 523 
 Rufus Thomas – "The Breakdown (Part II)"* (from Stax Records 2025060 7" single) (1971) Stax Records
 Jim Dandy – "Country Cooking" (from Flash Fearless Versus the Zorg Women Parts 5 & 6) (1975) Chrysalis Records
 Pleasure – "Joyous" (from Joyous) (1977) Fantasy Records
 Solomon Burke – "Get Out of My Life, Woman"* (from I Wish I Knew) (1968) Atlantic Records
 Alphonse Mouzon – "You Don't Know How Much I Love You" (from Funky Snakefoot) (1974) Blue Note Records
 Delegation – "Oh Honey" (from Promise of Love) (1977) Shady Brook Records
 Freda Payne – "The Easiest Way to Fall"* (from Band of Gold) (1970) Invictus Records

 SBR 524 
 Lowell Fulsom – "Tramp" (from Tramp) (1967) Kent / United Records
 Freddie Scott – "(You) Got What I Need" (from S233 7" single) (1968) Shout Records
 Lyn Collins – "You Can't Love Me, If You Don't Respect Me" (from PE-650 7" single)  (1973) People Records
 The Emotions – "Blind Alley" (from Untouched) (1971) Volt / Stax Records
 Lonnie Liston Smith – "Expansions (Part 1)" (from Expansions) (1975) Flying Dutchman Records
 Otis Redding – "Hard to Handle"* (from The Immortal Otis Redding) (1968) ATCO Records
 The Grass Roots – "You and Love Are the Same" (from Feelings) (1969) ABC / Dunhill Records
 Tom Scott and the L.A. Express – "Sneakin' in the Back" (from Tom Scott and The L.A. Express) (1974) Ode Records

 SBR 525 
 Southside Movement – "I've Been Watching You" (from Southside Movement) (1973) 20th Century Records
 Lou Donaldson – "Pot Belly" (from Pretty Things) (1970) Blue Note Records
 Samba Soul – "Mambo #5" (from Samba Soul) (1977) RCA Records
 Five Stairsteps – "Don't Change Your Love"* (from Love's Happening) (1968) Curtom Records
 Lamont Dozier – "Take Off Your Make-up" (from Out Here on My Own) (1973) ABC Records
 Ike White – "Love and Affection" (from Changin' Times) (1976) LAX Records
 James Brown – "The Payback"* (from The Payback) (1973) Polydor Records

 Oddities 
There are some oddities in the collection, with releases SBR 499 and SBR 500 discontinued and now considered "unofficial", while SBR 508 was released with two different track listings. The later, alternate track listing for SBR 508 is as below.

 SBR 508 
 Incredible Bongo Band – "Sing, Sing, Sing" (from  The Return of the Incredible Bongo Band) (1974)
 J. J. Johnson – "Parade Strut" (from Willie Dynamite soundtrack) (1974)
 Blowfly – "Sesame Street" (from Blowfly on TV) (1974)
 Manzel – "Midnight Theme" (1979) (from the Fraternity Records 3745 7" single) (1979)
 Mike Curb Congregation – "Burning Bridges" (from the Kelly's Heroes soundtrack) (1970)
 Freddie Perren – "Two Pigs and a Hog" (from the Cooley High soundtrack) (1975)
 The Fatback Band – "Fatbackin'" (from People Music) (1973)
 Jesse Green – "Flip" (from Flip) (1976)

Later volumes
Also, two later volumes were released, both as SBR 526. The first version was re-released as Strictly Breaks 1, and the second version was actually mixed and re-edited by Louis Flores.

 SBR 526 
 Joe Tex – "You Said a Bad Word" (from the Mercury Records 6052156 7" single) (1972)
 Johnnie Taylor – "Ever Ready" (from Ever Ready) (1978)
 Coalkitchen – "Keep on Pushing" (from Choose Your Flavor) (1977)
 Graham Central Station – "The Jam" (from Ain't No 'Bout-a-Doubt It) (1975)
 Trouble Funk – "Let's Get Small" (from the RC-501 12" single)
 Tony Alvon & the Belairs – "Sexy Coffee Pot" (from Atlantic Records 452632 7" single) (1969)
 Hank Carbo – "Hot Pants Pt. 2" (from the A-1172 7" single) (1971)

Other notes
The earliest track on the Ultimate Breaks and Beats series is Joe Tex's "Papa Was Too", released in 1966, with the latest being Fonda Rae's "Touch Me (All Night Long)", released in 1984.

The rarest track to be included on the Ultimate Breaks & Beats series is Manzel's "Midnight Theme", originally released on a Fraternity Records 7" record in 1975, though multiple reissues have been released and the song is available on many websites, including YouTube. However, for unknown reasons, the track was the only track left off a CD of all the tracks ever released on the Ultimate Breaks and Beats albums, possibly due to copyright issues.

DJ Superix, a British DJ, is the first DJ known to have compiled every single break from every volume of Ultimate Breaks and Beats into one mix, entitled "Ultimate, Ultimate, Ultimate!", released in 2008. DJs Harry Love and MK originally released a mix CD as a tribute to the series entitled Beats Per Minute. While this CD did not feature every break, it was one of the first in the UK dedicated to be the Ultimate Breaks & Beats series. 
The first ever DJ mix in tribute to Ultimate Breaks & Beats is DJ Q Bert's Demolition Pumpkin Squeeze Musik (1994). Subtitled as "A Pre-School Break Mix", DJ QBert mixed duplicate copies of UBB tracks with scratching and incorporated dialogue and samples from television, film and popular culture, notably comic books, cartoons and video games.

 Other similar breakbeat compilations 
Many drum break series compilation albums followed Ultimate Breaks and Beats, including:Diggin (19 volumes)Strictly Breaks (11 volumes)Dusty Fingers (17 volumes)Soul Beats (9 volumes)Super Breaks and Beats (8 volumes)Argo/Cadet Grooves (7 volumes)Drum Crazy (6 volumes)Schoolyard Breaks, Rhythm Madness, and Circuit Breaks (all 2 volumes)Breaksploitaton (2 volumes)

References

External links 
Street Beat Records Discography at Discogs
Stream 'Ultimate, Ultimate, Ultimate! mix at Southern Hospitality
Ultimate Ultimate Ultimate! at Discogs

Breaks
Hip hop compilation albums
Compilation album series
1980s compilation albums
1990s compilation albums